Hadopyrgus is a genus of white or transparent freshwater snails found only in New Zealand. They are micromolluscs, just a few millimetres long, in the  gastropod family Tateidae. Hadopyrgus species are subterranean – living in caves, underground aquifers, or deep in river gravels – and so were named from the Greek hades (underworld) and pyrgos (tower). They can have quite restricted ranges: Hadopyrgus ngataana, for example, has been found in just one pool, in a stream flowing through a single cave.

Species
Species within the genus Hadopyrgus include:
 Hadopyrgus anops Climo, 1974
 Hadopyrgus brevis Climo, 1974
 Hadopyrgus dubius Haase, 2008
 Hadopyrgus expositus Haase, 2008
 Hadopyrgus ngataana Haase, 2008
 Hadopyrgus rawhiti Haase, 2008
 Hadopyrgus sororius Haase, 2008

References

Tateidae
Gastropods of New Zealand